Lou Mathews is an American writer, novelist, journalist, playwright and short story writer based in Los Angeles. He was born in Glendale, California, earned his B.A. degree from the University of California at Santa Cruz in 1973, and his M.F.A. from Vermont College in 1987.  His novel, L.A. Breakdown (1999), was noted by the Los Angeles Times as a "Best Book" of 1999.  L.A. Breakdown is a novel describing the street racing scene in Los Angeles circa 1967. His novel Shaky Town was published in 2021.

Fiction
His short stories have been published in and appeared in anthologies such as The Pushcart Prize XV, The Pushcart Prize Anthology, The Best of the Pushcart Prize, L.A. Shorts, Love Stories for the Rest of Us and The Gotham Writers' Workshop Fiction.

Nonfiction and Journalism
His nonfiction has appeared in the Los Angeles Times, The L.A. Reader, L.A. Weekly, Mother Jones, Tin House and L.A. Style. For eight years at L.A. Style, Mathews was a contributing editor and also a restaurant reviewer. He currently teaches fiction writing and literature at the UCLA Extension Writer's Program, where he was named "Teacher of the Year" in 2002.

Short Plays & Films
Among the short plays that he has written and that have been produced include Rancho Alisos, A Curse on Chavez Ravine, You Did Some Good Work Once, Jaws of Life and a radio play, Captain Manners. The Duke's Development, his first full-length play, was a second prize winner in the 2000 National Repertory Theatre Foundations National Playwriting Contest.

A short film directed by Dora Pena based on one of his short stories, Crazy Life premiered at the Barcelona Film Festival.

Awards
He has received a National Endowment for the Arts Fellowship in Fiction, a California Arts Council Fiction Fellowship, a Pushcart Prize, and a Katherine Anne Porter Prize.
Lou Mathews is one of eight recipients of the UCLA Extension Distinguished Instructor Award

References

External links
Lou Mathews Biography, UCLA Writer's Program
"Garlic Eater" by Lou Mathews, at failbetter.com
L.A. Breakdown by Lou Mathews at Amazon
Shaky Town at Tiger Van Books
New England Review interview with Lou Mathews 
Chicago Tribune, Author and TV showrunner Jim Gavin started a publishing company that so far has published a single book: 'Shaky Town' 
Writer's Digest, How to Tie a Collection of Short Stories Together in a Cohesive Book

20th-century American novelists
American male novelists
Writers from Los Angeles
Living people
20th-century American male writers
Year of birth missing (living people)
Writers from California